Adams House may refer to:

In England
 Adams House (London), a listed building
 The Adams House, York, a listed building

In the United States
Captain Adams House, Daphne, Alabama, listed on the National Register of Historic Places
W. E. Adams House, Phoenix, Arizona, listed on the National Register of Historic Places
James P. and Sarah Adams House, Tucson, Arizona, listed on the National Register of Historic Places
Adams-Leslie House, Warren, Arkansas
Davis-Adams House, Warren, Arkansas
Orman-Adams House, Pueblo, Colorado, listed on the National Register of Historic Places
Joseph T. Adams House, Georgetown, Delaware
Carl G. Adams House, Miami Springs, Florida
Adams-Matheson House, Hartwell, Georgia
Adams House (Lavonia, Georgia), listed on the National Register of Historic Places
William and Jessie M. Adams House, Chicago, Illinois
Mary W. Adams House, Highland Park, Illinois
Noftzger-Adams House, North Manchester, Indiana
Walker Adams House, Davenport, Iowa
Adams-Higgins House, Spencer, Iowa
Adams House (Salvisa, Kentucky)
Adams House (Baton Rouge, Louisiana), listed on the National Register of Historic Places
Charles P. Adams House, Grambling, Louisiana
Archibald-Adams House, Cherryfield, Maine
Adams-Crocker-Fish House, Barnstable, Massachusetts
Adams House (Harvard University), Cambridge, Massachusetts
Adams-Clarke House, Georgetown, Massachusetts
Abraham Adams House, Newbury, Massachusetts
Amos Adams House, Newton, Massachusetts
Seth Adams House, Newton, Massachusetts
Adams National Historical Park, Quincy, Massachusetts
John Quincy Adams Birthplace, Quincy, Massachusetts
John Adams Birthplace, Quincy, Massachusetts
Peacefield, the home of U.S. President John Adams and other Adamses, Quincy, Massachusetts
Adams-Magoun House, Somerville, Massachusetts
Charles Adams-Woodbury Locke House, Somerville, Massachusetts
Benjamin Adams House, Uxbridge, Massachusetts
Adams-French House, Aberdeen, Mississippi, listed on the National Register of Historic Places
Adams-Taylor-McRae House, Elwood Community, Mississippi, listed on the National Register of Historic Places
John A. Adams Farmstead Historic District, Warrensburg, Missouri
Adams House (Carson City, Nevada)
John Adams Homestead-Wellscroft, Harrisville, New Hampshire
Dr. Daniel Adams House, Keene, New Hampshire
Adams-Ryan House, Adams Basin, New York
Judge Junius G. Adams House, Biltmore Forest, North Carolina
John H. Adams House, High Point, North Carolina
Adams-Edwards House, Raleigh, North Carolina
Adams-Fairview Bonanza Farm, Wahepton, North Dakota
G. Adams House, Millersburg, Ohio
John and Maria Adams House, Olmsted Falls, Ohio
Adams-Gray House, Trinway, Ohio
George W. Adams House, Trinway, Ohio
Demas Adams House, Worthington, Ohio
Charles F. Adams House, Portland, Oregon
Louis J. Adams House, Silverton, Oregon
John E. Adams House, Pawtucket, Rhode Island
E.C. Adams House, Watertown, South Dakota, listed on the National Register of Historic Places
Joe Chase Adams House, Lewisburg, Tennessee
Baptist Female College-Adams House, Woodbury, Tennessee, listed on the National Register of Historic Places
Armstrong-Adams House, Salado, Texas, listed on the National Register of Historic Places
Joseph Frederick Adams House, Bluff, Utah
Joseph Adams House (Layton, Utah)
George and Temperance Adams House, Orem, Utah
John Alma Adams House, Pleasant Grove, Utah

See also
John Adams House (disambiguation)
Joseph Adams House (disambiguation)
Adams Block, NRHP-listed in Three Forks, Montana
Adams Building (disambiguation)
Adams School (disambiguation)
Adams Farm (disambiguation)